G-protein coupled receptor 161 is a protein that in humans is encoded by the GPR161 gene.

References

Further reading

G protein-coupled receptors